Eric Lawrence Miller from Tufts University was named Fellow of the Institute of Electrical and Electronics Engineers (IEEE) in 2012 for contributions to inverse problems and physics-based signal and image processing.

References

External links
 Tufts University Bio

Fellow Members of the IEEE
Living people
Year of birth missing (living people)
Place of birth missing (living people)
Tufts University faculty
American electrical engineers